Amla Ashok Ruia is an Indian social activist known for her work in water harvesting.

Career
Ruia was inspired by severe droughts in 1999/2000 and 2003 to improve water harvesting in Rajasthan villages. She founded the Aakar Charitable Trust(ACT) to partner with villages to build check dams that provide water security.

Her first check dam project was in Mandawar village, Rajasthan, which was a success. Farmers managed to earn up to 120 million rupees in a year via the two check dams built by Aakar Charitable Trust. By the end of 2017, Aakar Charitable Trust had built more than 200 check dams in more than 115 villages in Rajasthan, with flow-on effects to almost 200 other villages. The Trust provides 60-70% of the resources required to construct each check dam, while the village where the dam is sited provides 30-40% of resources, participates in its construction, and is responsible for its maintenance. The check dams allow the aquifers to be replenished during the monsoon, so that bore wells and hand-pumps are recharged. Villagers have been able to grow up to three crops per year and keep livestock. Ruia estimates that the resulting increased income gives a 750% return on the investment in the check dams. |Girls are able to attend school, as they no longer need to help their mothers carry water from long distances, and students can undertake tertiary education. Ruia is popularly known as Paani Mata ("Water Mother").

Ruia and her team have extended their efforts in other states such as Madhya Pradesh, Maharashtra, Odisha, and the Dantewada district in Chhattisgarh, and have plans to expand into Bihar, Haryana, Uttaranchal and Uttar Pradesh.

In 2011, Ruia was awarded a Lakshmipat Singhania - IIM Lucknow National Leadership Award in the category of Community Service and Social Upliftment. In 2016, she was nominated for the Women of Worth Social Award category. In 2018, she received the India Eye International Human Rights Observer Achievement Award 2018.

Personal life
Amla Ruia was born in Uttar Pradesh. She currently lives in Malabar Hill, Mumbai, Maharashtra.

References

Indian environmentalists
Living people
People from Mumbai
Indian women environmentalists
Activists from Maharashtra
Women educators from Maharashtra
Educators from Maharashtra
Women human rights activists
Year of birth missing (living people)